Aslanov is a surname. The surname is a slavicised form of the turkic male name Aslan. Notable people with the surname include:

Aslan Aslanov (born 1951), Azerbaijani journalist
Fuad Aslanov (born 1976), Azerbaijani boxer
Hazi Aslanov (1910–1945), Azerbaijani Major-General of the Soviet armoured troops during World War II
Nikola Aslanov (1875–1905), Bulgarian revolutionary
Vugar Aslanov (born 1964), Azerbaijani journalist
Vüqar Aslanov (born 1976), Azerbaijani Olympic wrestler

Azerbaijani-language surnames